The discography of The Bravery, an American rock band, consists of three studio albums, one live album, one remix album, nine singles, two promotional singles and 11 music videos.

Albums

Studio albums

Live albums

Remix albums

Singles

Notes

Promotional singles

Music videos

Other appearances
The song "Ours" features on The Twilight Saga: Eclipse soundtrack, in the trailer for the 2011 film No Strings Attached, and appeared in the 2011 Need for Speed game Shift 2: Unleashed.
The Bravery recorded a cover of The Smashing Pumpkins' song "Rocket". The song was released on a cover mount CD for Spin magazine and on iTunes as a downloadable single.
The single "Unconditional" appeared in the video game Tony Hawk's American Wasteland. It also appeared in Ultimate Band.
The song "Believe" appeared in the fourth season of Prison Break, in the film Henry Poole Is Here, in the Gossip Girl episode "The Wild Brunch", in the first season of Reaper, in the episode "Moonlight" of Arrested Development, can be played on the game Band Hero, and was included on the soundtrack of Madden NFL 08.
The song "An Honest Mistake" (original) was featured on the video game MVP Baseball 2005 and appeared in the Heroes season 4 premiere, "Orientation".
The song "An Honest Mistake" (Superdiscount Remix) was featured in the video game Burnout Revenge.
The song "An Honest Mistake" was featured in the PS2 game True Crime: New York City.
The song "An Honest Mistake" was featured on CSI: NY in episode 6 of season 2, "Youngblood".
The song "Swollen Summer" was featured in the video game Gran Turismo 4, in the movie Yes Man and to promote the TV series Beaver Falls.
The song "This Is Not the End" was featured in the video game NBA 08.
The song "Time Won't Let Me Go" appeared in the episode "Run Copper Run" (season 5, episode 5) of the TV series Las Vegas.
The song "Time Won't Let Me Go" featured during the ending credits of the film Never Back Down, which also featured "Above and Below".
A commercial for the Bears–Packers NFL playoff game also featured "Time Won't Let Me Go".
The song "The Ocean" appeared on Grey's Anatomy season 4, episode 3 "Let the Truth Sting".
The song "I Am Your Skin" appeared in the Chuck episode "Chuck Versus the Living Dead" (season 3, episode 17).
The song "Public Service Announcement" appeared in a promotional commercial for the series Rescue Me.
The song "Fearless" appeared at the end of the American and German versions of the film Night Watch.
In 2009, Seattle emcee Macklemore producer Ryan Lewis sampled the Bravery's song "Believe" for "Crew Cuts", a track that was an ode to 1980s pop culture on their critically acclaimed project, The VS. EP.
In the popular game World of Warcraft there is an Alliance ship named "The Bravery" with "Angelina Soluna" as the ship's captain.

References

Rock music group discographies
Discographies of American artists
Alternative rock discographies